The Restoration Man is a British home improvement television series presented by George Clarke. It first aired on Channel 4 on 14 March 2010.

Synopsis
Architect George Clarke travels around Great Britain profiling people restoring historically and architecturally significant buildings. The series typically features people aiming to convert non-residential structures – including churches, water towers and windmills – into homes. Each episode chronicles the difficulties the owners face during the conversion, including restrictions in place for listed buildings. Clarke researches each building's history and architecture, interviews people who previously lived or worked there, and shares his findings with the new owners.

Episodes

Series 1

Series 2

Series 3

Series 4

Series 5

Series 6

Series 7

References

External links
 Channel 4 website
 

2010 British television series debuts
2017 British television series endings
Channel 4 original programming
Television series by Tiger Aspect Productions
Television series by Endemol
Home renovation television series
English-language television shows